Dexter is a city in Dexter Township, Mower County, Minnesota, United States.  The population was 341 at the 2010 census.

History
Dexter was platted in 1874 and named for Dexter Parrit, an early settler. A post office has been in operation at Dexter since 1874. Dexter was incorporated in 1878.

Geography

Dexter is located along Interstate 90, State Highway 16 (MN 16), and Mower County Roads 2 and 7.

Demographics

2010 census
As of the census of 2010, there were 341 people, 144 households, and 100 families living in the city. The racial makeup of the city was 95.9% White, 0.6% African American, 0.9% Native American, 0.3% Asian, 0.3% from other races, and 2.1% from two or more races. Hispanic or Latino of any race were 1.8% of the population.

There were 144 households, of which 29.9% had children under the age of 18 living with them, 52.1% were married couples living together, 11.8% had a female householder with no husband present, 5.6% had a male householder with no wife present, and 30.6% were non-families. 26.4% of all households were made up of individuals, and 12.5% had someone living alone who was 65 years of age or older. The average household size was 2.37 and the average family size was 2.78.

The median age in the city was 41.2 years. 21.4% of residents were under the age of 18; 8.3% were between the ages of 18 and 24; 25.3% were from 25 to 44; 29.4% were from 45 to 64; and 15.8% were 65 years of age or older. The gender makeup of the city was 50.1% male and 49.9% female.

2000 census
As of the census of 2000, there were 333 people, 130 households, and 89 families living in the city. The racial makeup of the city was 97.30% White, 0.60% Native American, 0.30% Asian, 1.20% from other races, and 0.60% from two or more races. Hispanic or Latino of any race were 1.80% of the population.

There were 130 households, out of which 37.7% had children under the age of 18 living with them, 57.7% were married couples living together, 7.7% had a female householder with no husband present, and 31.5% were non-families. 30.0% of all households were made up of individuals, and 11.5% had someone living alone who was 65 years of age or older.  The average household size was 2.56 and the average family size was 3.20.In the city, the population was spread out, with 29.7% under the age of 18, 6.6% from 18 to 24, 29.4% from 25 to 44, 22.8% from 45 to 64, and 11.4% who were 65 years of age or older.  The median age was 36 years. For every 100 females, there were 88.1 males.  For every 100 females age 18 and over, there were 87.2 males.

The median income for a household in the city was $31,875, and the median income for a family was $41,250. Males had a median income of $29,861 versus $23,750 for females. The per capita income for the city was $14,199.  About 7.1% of families and 10.4% of the population were below the poverty line, including 11.7% of those under age 18 and 13.2% of those age 65 or over.

References

Further reading

External links

City-Data Comprehensive Statistical Data and more about Dexter

Cities in Minnesota
Cities in Mower County, Minnesota